Bhandari or Bhandary is a surname.

Bhandari or bhandary may also refer to:

Bhandari (caste)
Bhandari (politician), Indian politician in 1957
Bhandari, Osmanabad, a village in Osmanabad, Maharashtra, India
Bhandary, a cook in a lascar ship's crew